In plane geometry, the einstein problem asks about the existence of a single prototile that by itself forms an aperiodic set of prototiles, that is, a shape that can tessellate space, but only in a nonperiodic way. Such a shape is called an "einstein" (not to be confused with the physicist Albert Einstein), a play on the German words ein Stein, meaning one tile. Depending on the particular definitions of nonperiodicity and the specifications of what sets may qualify as tiles and what types of matching rules are permitted, the problem is either open or solved. The einstein problem can be seen as a natural extension of the second part of Hilbert's eighteenth problem, which asks for a single polyhedron that tiles Euclidean 3-space, but such that no tessellation by this polyhedron is isohedral. Such anisohedral tiles were found by Karl Reinhardt in 1928, but these anisohedral tiles all tile space periodically.

Proposed solutions 

In 1988, Peter Schmitt discovered a single aperiodic prototile in 3-dimensional Euclidean space. While no tiling by this prototile admits a translation as a symmetry, some have a screw symmetry. The screw operation involves a combination of a translation and a rotation through an irrational multiple of π, so no number of repeated operations ever yield a pure translation. This construction was subsequently extended by John Horton Conway and Ludwig Danzer to a convex aperiodic prototile, the Schmitt-Conway-Danzer tile. The presence of the screw symmetry resulted in a reevaluation of the requirements for non-periodicity. Chaim Goodman-Strauss suggested that a tiling be considered strongly aperiodic if it admits no infinite cyclic group of Euclidean motions as symmetries, and that only tile sets which enforce strong aperiodicity be called strongly aperiodic, while other sets are to be called weakly aperiodic.

In 1996, Petra Gummelt constructed a decorated decagonal tile and showed that when two kinds of overlaps between pairs of tiles are allowed, the tiles can cover the plane, but only non-periodically. A tiling is usually understood to be a covering with no overlaps, and so the Gummelt tile is not considered an aperiodic prototile. An aperiodic tile set in the Euclidean plane that consists of just one tile–the Socolar–Taylor tile–was proposed in early 2010 by Joshua Socolar and Joan Taylor. This construction requires matching rules, rules that restrict the relative orientation of two tiles and that make reference to decorations drawn on the tiles, and these rules apply to pairs of nonadjacent tiles. Alternatively, an undecorated tile with no matching rules may be constructed, but the tile is not connected. The construction can be extended to a three-dimensional,  connected tile with no matching rules, but this tile allows tilings that are periodic in one direction, and so it is only weakly aperiodic. Moreover, the tile is not simply connected.

The existence of a strongly aperiodic tile set for the Euclidean plane consisting of one connected tile without matching rules is an unsolved problem.

See also
Binary tiling, a weakly aperiodic tiling of the hyperbolic plane with a single tile

References 

Aperiodic tilings
Unsolved problems in geometry